What Happened Don't Lie is the debut album from Melbourne band Offcutts. It is the first full-length release following seven EPs over five years.

Track listing
"Diamond Bike"
"Fearless Fighters"
"By The Way"
"Shirt & Tie"
"Cold Morning Happiness"
"Valium Girl"
"Hub Cap"
"Hit Me With Your Best Shot"
"Stand Back"
"Youth Song"

2007 albums